He's Way More Famous Than You is a 2013 American comedy film written by and starring Halley Feiffer and Ryan Spahn, and directed by Michael Urie, who also costars. The film also stars Jesse Eisenberg, Ben Stiller, Mamie Gummer, Ralph Macchio, Vanessa Williams, Tracee Chimo, Austin Pendleton, and Michael Chernus. It premiered at the 2013 Slamdance Film Festival, where it was acquired by Gravitas Ventures and for theatrical distribution.

The film was produced by Christopher Sepulveda and Michael Anderson of Logolite Entertainment, Ur-Mee Productions and Geoff Soffer. It was released pre-theatrically on iTunes, Amazon Video and Video on Demand on April 8, 2013, through Gravitas Ventures and Warner Bros., and was released theatrically in the United States and Canada on May 10, 2013. The DVD was released on September 24, 2013 by Kino Lorber and Archstone Distribution.

Plot
When once-up-and-coming indie film starlet Halley Feiffer loses her boyfriend, her agent and her career in one fell swoop she finally realizes that something has got to change...she has to become WAY MORE FAMOUS! Armed with a stolen script and two pitchers of sangria, Halley enlists the help of her brother Ryan to make a movie, starring herself (of course), and any A-list celebrity she can land. Halley will stop at nothing in this balls to the wall Hollywood comedy...even if it means hurting the only people who truly care about her.

Festivals
2013 Slamdance Film Festival (January 20) (World Premiere)
2013 Friars Club Comedy Film Festival (April 1) (Opening Night Film)
2013 Cleveland International Film Festival (April 6)
2013 Phoenix Film Festival (April 7) 
2013 Dallas International Film Festival (April 10)
2013 Newport Beach Film Festival (April 26)

References

External links
 
 

2013 films
American comedy films
2013 comedy films
Films scored by Jeff Beal
2010s English-language films
2010s American films